Museo Benini is a single-artist museum dedicated to the work of Italian artist Benini, born in Imola in the Emilia-Romagna region in 1941. It is in the Texas Hill Country, 47 miles northwest of Austin, Texas which is the home of two other single-artist museums: the Elisabet Ney Museum and the Umlauf Sculpture Garden and Museum. The museum, as well as a compound of other buildings, is set in 35 acres  just south of the city of Marble Falls. 
 

Built in 2015, Museo Benini showcases the contemporary artist's lifetime work, featuring paintings spanning more than sixty years. On exhibit are his early "superroses", geometric paintings, and more recent works of an abstract nature. In her April 2020 article for Sightlines magazine, Austin arts writer Barbara Purcell noted, "Museo Benini is the rare single artist museum where the artist is still alive and working." In her article for Glasstire magazine in August 2020, A Visit to Museo Benini in Marble Falls, Purcell states, "Entering the museum is like entering a church..."

See also
 List of single-artist museums

References

External links 
 Museum website
 Artist website

Art museums and galleries in Texas
Museums devoted to one artist